Connecticut Avenue is a major thoroughfare in the Northwest quadrant of Washington, D.C., and suburban Montgomery County, Maryland. It is one of the diagonal avenues radiating from the White House, and the segment south of Florida Avenue was one of the original streets in Pierre (Peter) Charles L'Enfant's plan for Washington. A five-mile segment north of Rock Creek was built in the 1890s by a real-estate developer.

History 
Connecticut Avenue was first extended north from Rock Creek around 1890 as part of an audacious plan to create a streetcar suburb—today's Chevy Chase, Maryland—several miles distant from built-up Washington, D.C. The area northwest of today's Calvert Street NW was largely farmland when Francis Newlands, a sitting Congressman from Nevada, quietly acquired more than 1,700 acres in Northwest D.C. and Maryland along a five-mile stretch from today's Woodley Park neighborhood in D.C. to Jones Bridge Road in Maryland's Montgomery County. Meanwhile, he acquired control of the nascent Rock Creek Railway, which had a charter to build a streetcar line in the District. Beginning in 1888, Newlands and his partners graded a roadway, laid streetcar track down its center, and erected a bridge over a Rock Creek tributary. The road proceeded in a straight, 3.3-mile line north-northwest from today's Calvert Street to today's Chevy Chase Circle, then another 1.85 miles due north to today's Chevy Chase Lake Drive. The streetcars began operating along the line's full length in 1892, connecting to their terminus at 18th and U Streets NW via the railway's iron trestle across the Rock Creek gorge.

In 1907, the Taft Bridge across Rock Creek connected the southern and northern segments of Connecticut Avenue.

In 1932, the Newlands bridge over the tributary was replaced by the current Klingle Valley Bridge.

Route description

District of Columbia

Connecticut Avenue begins just north of the White House at Lafayette Square. It is interrupted by Farragut Square. North of Farragut Square and K Street, Connecticut Avenue is one of the major streets in downtown Washington, with high-end restaurants, historical buildings such as Sedgwick Gardens, hotels, and shopping.

As Connecticut Avenue approaches the Dupont Circle neighborhood, it splits at N Street into a through roadway and service roadways. The through roadway tunnels under Dupont Circle, while the service roadways intersect the outer roadway of the circle. The through roadway and service roadways rejoin at R Street. Originally, there was no tunnel, and all vehicular traffic on Connecticut Avenue went through the circle. The tunnel was built in 1949.

After crossing Florida Avenue near the Hilton Washington hotel, Connecticut Avenue narrows and winds between the Kalorama neighborhoods. (The Kalorama Triangle district extends eastward from Connecticut, while Sheridan-Kalorama lies to the west.) The avenue then crosses Rock Creek Park on the William Howard Taft Bridge and goes through upper Northwest Washington, D.C., including the Woodley Park, Cleveland Park, Forest Hills, and Chevy Chase, D.C. neighborhoods. Between Woodley Park and Cleveland Park, Connecticut Avenue is carried over a deep valley on another bridge. Numerous older, Art Deco high-rise apartment buildings line the 3000 block, with slightly newer apartment buildings in the 4000 and 5000 blocks.

The National Zoological Park sits halfway between the Woodley Park-Zoo/Adams Morgan and Cleveland Park Metro stations. A bit further north is the strikingly futuristic former headquarters of Intelsat; a bit further south are the landmark Wardman Park Marriott Hotel, the city's largest, and the Omni Shoreham Hotel. This section is also a major commuter route; until 2020, it had reversible lanes along most of its length which operate during the morning and evening rush hours (7:00–9:30 a.m. and 4:00–6:30 p.m.). It connects with the Rock Creek and Potomac Parkway via 24th Street. Mid-century era high-rise apartments line the avenue, with elegant, older detached homes on shady side streets.

Connecticut Avenue is an arterial route in the National Highway System between K Street and Nebraska Avenue.

Maryland

After passing the main campus of the University of the District of Columbia near the Van Ness metrorail station, Connecticut Avenue exits the District of Columbia at Chevy Chase Circle, which is at the intersection of Connecticut and Western Avenues. Once entering Maryland, it gains the route designation Maryland State Highway 185 and goes through the Chevy Chase, Maryland postal area. The former National 4-H Youth Conference Center is on this stretch of Connecticut Avenue, as is the Chevy Chase Club.

After interchanging with the Capital Beltway at Exit 33, Connecticut Avenue enters Kensington, where it is the major north-south street of the central business district. 

Connecticut Avenue long ended at University Boulevard (Maryland State Highway 193). Then Concord Avenue was extended northward to form an extension of Connecticut Avenue that passes through Wheaton and Aspen Hill. The state route designation ends at Georgia Avenue (Maryland State Highway 97). Connecticut Avenue, now simply a local street, continues past Georgia Avenue and ends at Leisure World Boulevard.

Transit service

Metrorail
The Red Line of the Washington Metro subway system runs beneath Connecticut Avenue. Metro stations along or near Connecticut Avenue include:
 Farragut West   
 Farragut North 
 Dupont Circle 
 Woodley Park 
 Cleveland Park 
 Van Ness-UDC

Metrobus
The following Metrobus routes travel along the street (listed from south to north):
 42, 43 (Columbia Road to Farragut Square)
 N2, N4, N6 (southbound only, from Dupont Circle to Farragut Square)
 L1, L2 (Chevy Chase Circle to Farragut Square)
 H2 (Van Ness Street to Porter Street)
 L8 (Aspen Hill to Friendship Heights)

Ride On
The following Ride On routes travel along the street (listed from south to north):
 1, 11 (East West Highway to Chevy Chase Circle)
 34 (Bel Pre Road to Veirs Mill Road, and later University Boulevard to Knowles Avenue)
 41 (Bel Pre Road to Weller Road)

MARC Train
The following MARC Train stop lies on the street:
 Kensington Station

Notes

Roads in Montgomery County, Maryland
Streets in Washington, D.C.
Dupont Circle
Roads with a reversible lane